Laura Morelli is an American art historian and the USA Today bestselling author of travel guides and historical fiction.

Career 
After beginning a career teaching art history at the college level, Laura Morelli began to capture stories of traditional artisans. Morelli has been a Contributing Editor to National Geographic Traveler and has written for USA Today, Departures, and other travel publications. She also contributes lessons to TED-Ed. Her historical fiction focuses on topics of art history. The Gondola Maker debuted with a starred review in Publishers Weekly. The historical novel earned an IPPY Award and a Benjamin Franklin Digital Award.

Bibliography

Fiction

Nonfiction

Personal life 
Morelli was raised on the coast of Georgia. She received a bachelor's degree from the University of Georgia and a master's degree in the History of Art & Architecture from Tufts University. She earned a Ph.D. in Art History from Yale University.

References

External links 
 Official website
 

Year of birth missing (living people)
Living people
Novelists from Georgia (U.S. state)
American art historians
University of Georgia alumni
Tufts University alumni
Yale University alumni
Women art historians
American women historians
21st-century American historians
21st-century American novelists
21st-century American women writers
Historians from Georgia (U.S. state)
American historical novelists
Women historical novelists